Leckie is an unincorporated community in McDowell County, West Virginia, United States.

The community was named after William Leckie, a mining official.

References

Unincorporated communities in McDowell County, West Virginia
Unincorporated communities in West Virginia